Hermann Asmus (1887–1968) was a German art director.

Selected filmography
 When Women Keep Silent (1937)
Lady Killer (1937)
 Kora Terry (1940)
 Twilight (1940)
 Andreas Schlüter (1942)
 Sky Hounds (1942)
 Melody of a Great City (1943)
 The Black Robe (1944)
 Das Mädchen Christine (1949)
 The Marriage of Figaro (1949)
 Heart of Stone (1950)
 The Sailor's Song (1958)

References

Bibliography
 Giesen, Rolf. Nazi Propaganda Films: A History and Filmography. McFarland, 2003.

External links

1887 births
1968 deaths
German art directors
Film people from Berlin